Water pollution is a major environmental issue in India. The largest source of water pollution in India is untreated
sewage. Other sources of pollution include agricultural runoff and unregulated small-scale industry. Most rivers, lakes and surface water in India are polluted due to industries, untreated sewage and solid wastes. Although the average annual precipitation in India is about 4000 billion cubic metres, only about 1122 billion cubic metres of water resources are available for utilization due to lack of infrastructure. Much of this water is unsafe, because pollution degrades water quality. Water pollution severely limits the amount of water available to Indian consumers, its industry and its agriculture.

Causes of pollution

Untreated sewage 
There is a large gap between generation and treatment of domestic waste water in India. The problem is not only that India lacks sufficient treatment capacity but also that the sewage treatment plants that exist do not operate and are not maintained.

The majority of the government-owned sewage treatment plants remain closed most of the time due to improper design or poor maintenance or lack of reliable electricity supply to operate the plants, together with absentee employees and poor management. The waste water generated in these areas normally percolates into the soil or evaporates. The uncollected waste accumulates in the urban areas causing unhygienic conditions and releasing pollutants that leach into surface and groundwater.
Sewage discharged from cities, towns and some villages is the predominant cause of water pollution in India. Investment is needed to bridge the gap between the sewage India generates and its treatment capacity of sewage per day. Major cities of India produce 38,354 million litres per day (MLD) of sewage, but the urban sewage treatment capacity is only 11,786 MLD. A large number of Indian rivers are severely polluted as a result of discharge of domestic sewage.

The scientific analysis of water samples from 1995 to 2008 indicates that the organic and bacterial contamination is severe in water bodies of India. This is mainly due to discharge of domestic waste water in untreated form, mostly from the urban centres of India.

Agricultural Run-off and Industrial Wastewater 
Pesticides are a major contaminant of water bodies in developing countries. Many pesticides have been banned all over the world due to their environmental damage such as Dichlorodiphenyltrichloroethane (DDT), Aldrin and Hexachlorocyclohexane (HCH), but are still commonly used as a cheap and easily available alternative to other pesticides in India. India has used over 350,000 million tonnes of DDT since 1985, even though DDT was banned in 1989. The introduction of agrochemicals like HCH and DDT into water bodies can cause bioaccumulation, since these chemicals are resistant to degradation. These chemicals are a part of Persistent Organic Pollutants (POPs), which are potential carcinogens and mutagens. The levels of POPs found in several Indian rivers are well above the WHO permissible limit.

The wastewater from many industries in India is discarded in rivers. From 2016 to 2017, it is estimated that 7.17 million tonnes of hazardous waste was produced by industrial plants. The Central Pollution Control Board (CPCB) reported that as of 2016, there were 746 industries directly depositing wastewater into the Ganga, which is the largest river in India. This wastewater contains heavy metals such as lead, cadmium, copper, chromium, zinc, and arsenic, which negatively affect both aquatic life as well as human health. Bioaccumulation of these metals can cause several adverse effects on health such as impaired cognitive function, gastrointestinal damage, or renal damage.

Other problems 

A joint study by PRIMER and the Punjab Pollution Control Board in 2008, revealed that in villages along the Nullah, fluoride, mercury, beta-endosulphan and heptachlor pesticide were more than permissible limit (MPL) in ground and tap water. Plus the water had high concentration of COD and BOD (chemical and biochemical oxygen demand), ammonia, phosphate, chloride, chromium, arsenic and chlorpyrifos pesticide. The ground water also contains nickel and selenium, while the tap water has high concentration of lead, nickel and cadmium.

Flooding during monsoons worsens India's water pollution problem, as it washes and moves solid waste and contaminated soils into its rivers and wetlands.

Quality of water resources

Quality Monitoring 
The Central Pollution Control Board, a Ministry of Environment & Forests Government of India entity, has established a National Water Quality Monitoring Network comprising 1,429 monitoring stations in 28 states and 6 in Union Territories on various rivers and water bodies across the country. This effort monitors water quality year round. The monitoring network covers 293 rivers, 94 lakes, 9 tanks, 41 ponds, 8 creeks, 23 canals, 18 drains and 411 wells distributed across India. Water samples are routinely analysed for 28 parameters including dissolved oxygen, bacteriological and other internationally established parameters for water quality. Additionally 9 trace metals parameters and 28 pesticide residues are analysed. Biomonitoring is also carried out on specific locations.

Organic matter 

In 2010 the water quality monitoring found almost all rivers with high levels of BOD (a measure of pollution with organic matter). The worst pollution, in decreasing order, were found in river Markanda (490 mg/L BOD), followed by river Kali (364), river Amlakhadi (353), Yamuna canal (247), river Yamuna at Delhi (70) and river Betwa (58). For context, a water sample with a 5-day BOD between 1 and 2 mg O/L indicates a very clean water, 3 to 8 mg O/L indicates a moderately clean water, 8 to 20 indicates borderline water, and greater than 20 mg O/L indicates ecologically unsafe, polluted water.

The levels of BOD are severe near the cities and major towns. In rural parts of India, the river BOD levels were sufficient to support aquatic life.

Coliform levels 

Rivers Yamuna, Ganga, Gomti, Ghaghara, Chambal, Mahi, Vardha and Godavari, are amongst the other most coliform polluted water bodies in India. For context, coliform must be below 104 MPN/100 mL, preferably absent from water for it to be considered safe for general human use, and for irrigation where coliform may cause disease outbreak from contaminated-water in agriculture.

In 2006, 47 percent of water quality monitoring reported coliform concentrations above 500 MPN/100 mL. During 2008, 33 percent of all water quality monitoring stations reported a total coliform levels exceeding those levels, suggesting recent effort to add pollution control infrastructure and upgrade treatment plants in India, may be reversing the water pollution trend.

Treatment of domestic sewage and subsequent utilization of treated sewage for irrigation can prevent pollution of water bodies, reduce the demand for fresh water in the irrigation sector and become a resource for irrigation. Since 2005, Indian wastewater treatment plant market has been growing annually at the rate of 10 to 12 percent. The United States is the largest supplier of treatment equipment and supplies to India, with 40 percent market share of new installation. At that rate of expansion, and assuming the government of India continues on its path of reform, major investments in sewage treatment plants and electricity infrastructure development, it was estimated India will nearly triple its water treatment capacity by 2015, and treatment capacity supply will match India's daily sewage water treatment requirements by about 2020.

Solutions 
Water conservation in India is gaining pace. The Ganga rejuvenation efforts by the union government, the Yamuna clean-up are some of the government initiated efforts. The Chennai River Restoration trust's efforts to clean the Cooum, Adyar rivers in Chennai and civil society efforts spearheaded by organizations like Environmentalist Foundation of India (E.F.I) to clean lakes and ponds in the country are seen as significant development towards water conservation.

Sewage Treatment 
There is a huge gap between the sewage generated in India and the sewage treatment capacity of the country. The central government has largely left it up to the state governments to manage wastewater treatments, which has led to huge disparity in the management of wastewater amongst the several states. However, approximately 815 sewage treatment plants (STPs) are under development or have been planned in the last six years. This has increased the percentage of urban sewage treated from 37% in 2015 to 50% in 2021. There has also been an effort to encourage the reuse or recycling of treated wastewater in agriculture or industrial purposes to reduce the strain on groundwater resources.

Other technologies to treat municipal wastewater have also been explored. Natural wetlands have shown to be a good alternative to STPs to remove 76-78% of organic waste, 77-97% of nutrients, and 99.5-99.9% of microbes from wastewater. Decentralised Wastewater Treatment Systems (DEWATS) have been adopted in some parts of India and have also shown to be an economically feasible alternative to STPs, considering the cost of installing and maintaining an STP is high. The quality of the effluent discharged by the plants was found to be within the permissible limits of the CPCB.

Industrial Wastewater Treatment 
Industrial wastewater is highly unregulated in India. However, several initiatives have been taken by the government to prevent industrial pollution of water resources. Zero liquid discharge (ZLD) is a water treatment process to eliminate liquid waste from industries that release very polluted wastewater, such as the fertiliser sector and distilleries. ZLD has been encouraged by the government and since implemented at some large industrial plants like Unilever and P&G, but installation costs and failure to process large amounts of dissolved solids in wastewater are a huge deterrent for industrial plants to adopt this technology.

Specific rivers

The Ganges

More than 500 million people live along the [Ganges] River. An estimated 2,000,000 persons ritually bath daily in the river, which is considered holy by Hindus. Ganges river pollution is a major health risk.

NRGBA was established by the Central Government of India, on 20 February 2009 under Section 3(3) of the Environment Protection Act, 1986. It also declared Ganges as the "National River" of India. The chair includes the Prime Minister of India and Chief ministers of states through which the Ganges flows.

The Yamuna

By an estimate by 2012, Delhi's sacred Yamuna river contained 7,500 coliform bacteria per 100cc of water. A number of NGOs, pressure groups, eco-clubs, as well as citizens' movements, have been active in their task to clean the river.

Even though India revised its National Water Policy in 2002 to encourage community participation and decentralize water management, the country's complex bureaucracy ensures that it remains a "mere statement of intent." Responsibility for managing water issues is fragmented among a dozen different ministries and departments without any coordination. The government bureaucracy and state-run project department has failed to solve the problem, despite having spent many years and $140 million on this project.

Other
Buddha Nullah, a seasonal water stream, which runs through the Malwa region
The Mithi River, which flows through the city of Mumbai, is heavily polluted.
 Mithi River pollution
 Mula River pollution
 Musi River 
 Gomti River pollution
Vrishabhavathi River pollution

See also
 Alkali soil
 Environmental impact of irrigation
 Environmental issues in India
 Indian states and union territories ranked by prevalence of open defecation
 Ground water in India
 Interstate River Water Disputes Act
 Irrigation in India
 National Water Policy
 Water resources in India
 Water scarcity in India
 Water supply and sanitation in India
 Water pollution

References

External links
India Water Portal
UNICEF Water, Sanitation and Hygiene Annual Report 2010
https://www.hindutamil.in/news/tamilnadu/84986-.html
Yamuna Mission